= Xie Bao (restaurant) =

New York City restaurant chain

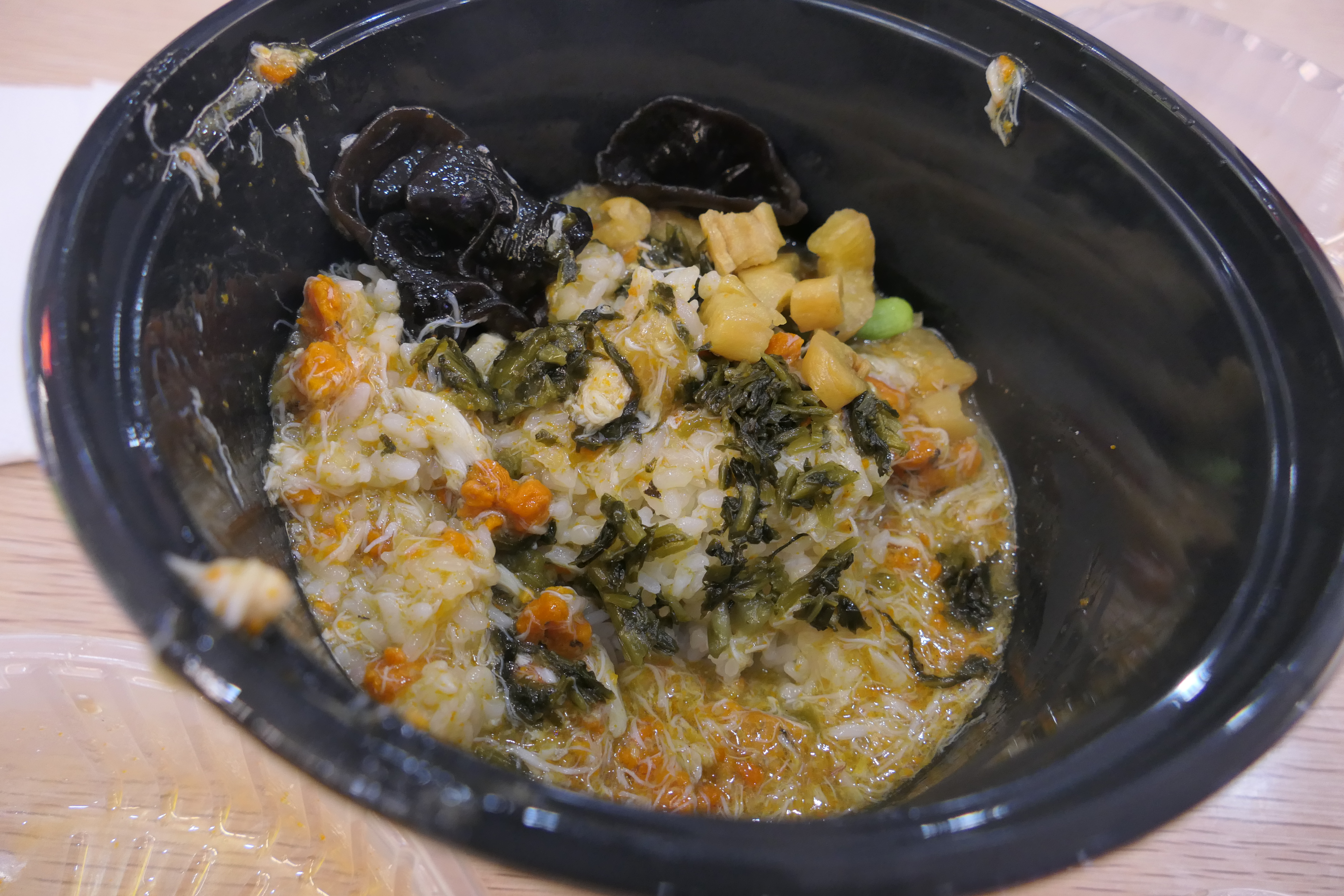
mixed and fully seasoned crab roe over rice

Xie Bao is a restaurant chain in New York City specializing in crab dishes.

The original restaurant opened in Flushing, with its signature dish being crab roe over rice. In 2025, a second restaurant was opened up in Hell's Kitchen which was also well received.
